The 1974–75 season was the 19th season of the Liga Nacional de Baloncesto. Real Madrid won the title.

Teams and venues

First stage

Relegation playoffs

|}

Stats Leaders

Points

References

ACB.com 
Linguasport 

Liga Española de Baloncesto (1957–1983) seasons
    
Spanish